Marumba cristata, the common striped hawkmoth, is a species of moth of the family Sphingidae. It is found from the Himalaya, through Nepal and north-east India, southern and central China to western Malaysia (Sundaland).

Description 
The wingspan is 100–124 mm.

Biology 
Adults are on wing in June and July in China. Larvae have been recorded on Litsea elongata, Machilus ichangensis and Phoebe (Lauraceae) species.

Subspecies
Marumba cristata cristata (from Himachal Pradesh (India) across Nepal and northeastern India to southern, central and northern China, northern Thailand, Laos and northern Vietnam)
Marumba cristata bukaiana Clark, 1937 (endemic to Taiwan)
Marumba cristata titan Rothschild, 1920 (Malaysia)

References

External links

Marumba
Moths described in 1875